Nga is a district (muang) of Oudomxay province in north-eastern Laos.

References

Districts of Oudomxay province